Jideofor Kenechukwu Achufusi (born 17 October 1991) is a Nigerian actor and model, known professionally as Swanky JKA. He is best known for his portrayal of Nnamdi Okeke in Living in Bondage: Breaking Free, as well as Chidi in Kambili: The Whole 30 Yards. He won the Trailblazer award at the 2020 Africa Magic Viewers' Choice Awards.

Career 
Originally a model, Achufusi began his acting career by playing supporting roles in Nollywood films Poka Messiah, Black Rose, Pretty Little Thing, Ofu Obi and A Lonely Lane. He made his breakthrough in 2019 by playing the charismatic Nnamdi Okeke in the movie Living in Bondage: Breaking Free, which earned him a Best Actor nomination and a Trailblazer award, both at the Africa Magic Viewers' Choice Awards in 2020.

Filmography

Awards

References

1991 births
Living people
Nigerian male film actors
Nigerian film directors
Nigerian male models
Nigerian film award winners
Nigerian television actors
Igbo actors
21st-century Nigerian male actors
AMVCA Trailblazer Award winners
20th-century births